Wishaw Football Club (previously known as Wishaw Juniors) is a Scottish football club based in the town of Wishaw, North Lanarkshire.

History

The club was founded in 1903 as Wishaw Amateurs, itself formed after the collapse of Wishaw United F.C., a club made from the remnants of the town's senior clubs Wishaw Thistle F.C. and Wishaw F.C., both of which were wound up in 1900.  

The club originally played in the Midland League and changed its name to Wishaw Thistle in 1906.  The club replaced Stenhousemuir F.C. in the Scottish Football Union in 1907, and entered the Scottish Cup on a number of occasions, but never made the tournament proper.  The club however won the Scottish Consolation Cup (for clubs eliminated from the qualifying rounds) in 1909.

The First World War had a dramatic effect on football but the club managed to continue to operate for a time, sometimes fielding 'guest players', i.e. service personnel who had been players with top English sides such as Tottenham Hotspur and Manchester City, but were stationed locally.  Wishaw Thistle's Club Captain, William Angus of Carluke who had also turned out for Glasgow Celtic, was to see action in France very early on in the war and was awarded the Victoria Cross for what was described as the most heroic deed ever by a British soldier in rescuing his officer, Lt William Martin (also from Carluke) on 12 June 1915 at Givenchy-lès-la-Bassée. William Angus was badly injured in the course of the rescue and although retaining a keen interest in football throughout his life – later being president of Carluke Rovers – he was unable to resume playing. After being presented with his medal by King George V,  the injured Angus returned to Scotland a National Hero and was presented to packed attendances at Parkhead (Glasgow Celtic) and Ibrox Park (Glasgow Rangers) receiving standing ovations at each stadium.

When football re-commenced at the end of World War I Wishaw Thistle attempted unsuccessfully to restart as a senior club then appears to have re-invented itself as a Junior club in the form of Wishaw YMCA Juniors bringing to an end over 30 years of Senior football in the town.

During its Senior years, Wishaw Thistle won a number of trophies and played host to visiting English Clubs Liverpool, Everton, Stoke, Sunderland and Notts County in friendly matches. It also took part in the Invitation Football Tournament at the 'International Exhibition'  held by Edinburgh City Council to commemorate the opening of the world-famous Forth Railway Bridge  and also played against many of today's current senior Scottish clubs in the S.F.A. Scottish Cup including, on one occasion hosting Glasgow Celtic in Wishaw. A number of the club's players went on to play for more illustrious clubs. One player, David Calderhead, was later to become manager of Chelsea F C, a position he held for about 25 years; he is credited with turning the London side from being a relatively small club into a major force in the English game.

Wishaw Thistle was a well-supported club in an era when football was growing rapidly as a spectator pastime and high four- and even five- figure crowds were not uncommon for major matches.

Wishaw Juniors
Wishaw's football club started its second 'incarnation' as a 'Junior' Club under the name of Wishaw YMCA Juniors in 1919–20  as members of the Scottish Junior League, enjoying early success in winning the Scottish Junior League Victory Cup and also the Hozier Cup (named after Lady Hozier, wife of Sir Winston Churchill). A second Hozier Cup was added the following season.  The name was then shortened to Wishaw Juniors in 1924 and the club switched to the Lanarkshire Junior Football League.

The club were then one of a large number of rebel clubs which broke away from the Scottish Junior FA in the bitter player contract based 'Intermediate dispute' in the late 1920s – playing for several seasons in the East Division of the Western Intermediate League before returning to the Junior fold once again after the dispute was resolved in 1930–31 as members of the Lanarkshire Junior League where the club remained until World War II.

The war had a major impact on football across the country with many clubs and Leagues closing down – many never to return  However, Wishaw  managed to continue in operation, competing in the short-lived Lanark and Lothians League which lasted during the War years with a number of Lanarkshire teams joining with their counterparts in West Lothian. During this period Wishaw reached the final of the East of Scotland Cup and have the unusual claim to be the only team to have played in the Scottish, West and East Cup finals. The club also won the St Michael's Cup one of the most prestigious trophies played for by East Junior Clubs. After the end of the War, Wishaw returned to the Lanarkshire Junior League when it reformed.

Re-organisation of Scottish Junior football in 1968 saw the end of the Lanarkshire Junior League which had been losing clubs as junior football declined with the remaining Lanarkshire clubs joining with those from the greater Glasgow area to form the Central Junior Football League. Although Wishaw did start out in the top 'A' Division  of the new Central Junior League, being one of the stronger Lanarkshire sides – for various reasons the club was unable to sustain its position  and dropped to the bottom 'C' division where it remained for a number of years.

Further re-organisation of Junior football saw the Central League amalgamate with the Ayrshire Junior Football League to form  the SJFA West Region in 2002. The club once again found itself stranded in the bottom tier of an expanded 'Regional' structure playing in the Central District Division 2. After struggling for most of the next dozen seasons, Wishaw finally achieved promotion out of the bottom Division in 2013/14 under then manager John McKeown. McKeown was to leave shortly thereafter to take over as manager of top Ayrshire side Cumnock Juniors.

It has been many years since Wishaw tasted success but despite the club's current lower league status it has nevertheless managed to reach the Sectional League Cup Semi-finals in each of seasons 2014–15, 2015–16 and 2016–17 and the Semi-final of the prestigious West of Scotland Junior Cup in 2015–16. In season 2017–18 Wishaw belied their third tier status by reaching the semi-final of the Scottish Junior Cup losing by a single goal in a two-leg tie against Ayrshire side Hurlford United.

Recent history
Beginning in the late 1960s, Wishaw suffered a prolonged period in the junior football 'wilderness' during which the club not only lost its home ground and most of its support base but also came close to folding completely on several occasions. The club's home town suffered significantly from the 1970s onwards with very high rates of unemployment following the demise of traditional industries locally particularly that of steel making and heavy engineering.  Eventually a small group of enthusiastic volunteers took over the running of the club in the early part of the current century and despite very restricted budgets, slow but steady progress was made in rebuilding the club on and off the pitch.

After moving to a new home at The Beltane, Wishaw finally secured promotion out of the bottom tier of the S.J.F.A. West Region in season 2013/14 under then manager John McKeown who left the club shortly thereafter to take over as manager of Cumnock Juniors.  The club moved quickly to secure a replacement and from October 2014 until August 2017 were managed by former Dunfermline Athletic midfielder, Chris McGroarty.
Despite losing several key players, Chris was successful not only in keeping the club in the 1st Division in his first season but also in building an attractive team which was to mount a serious challenge for further promotion in season 2015/16, only to miss out on this by a single point. The team started season 2016/17 well and having been drawn against Cumnock Juniors at home in the 1st Round of the Scottish Junior Cup then defeated the Premier League side by two goals to nil. However, the club failed to end the season in a promotion position.

In August 2017 Chris McGroarty and his assistant Glen Weir and coach Mark Daly left the club to join Kilsyth Rangers.  Wishaw again moved quickly to appoint former professional footballer John Brogan as their new manager. Brogan played for Scottish senior clubs St Johnstone (where he was that club's record goal scorer), Hibernian and Hamilton Academicals and also had extensive appropriate managerial experience having managed several other Junior Football clubs. Brogan resigned in February 2018 and was replaced by former Hearts striker, Derek Holmes.  Wishaw were then managed by Kieran McGuinness, assisted by Barry Fraser and Paul Finnigan until resigning in Dec 2019 citing other commitments. The club then moved quickly bringing back the former McGroarty, Daly, & Weir management team with Mark Daly taking the manager role.

Stadia
Wishaw has had a number of home grounds down the years and has played at Stewarton Street, at the Old Public Park (off Main Street) and at the original Belhaven Park (better known as the site of the former Wishaw Dog Track and originally the home of the Town's long defunct cycling club) but for most of its existence the club was based at Recreation Park at Kirk Road, Wishaw. The ground, which had banked terracing, a grandstand and a covered spectator area and Social Club was lost to the club in the early 1990s and thereafter Wishaw became homeless sharing with Coltness United at Victoria Park, Newmains for a number of years until 1999 when they secured tenancy at Wishaw Sports Centre. This agreement did not work out though and they returned to sharing with Coltness. Wishaw then secured a second deal to play at the Sports Centre, before moving into the nearby Beltane Park for the beginning of the 2011–12 season.[2]

Beltane Park

The Beltane, as it is known locally, is likely to be the team's home for the foreseeable future. Originally just an open public pitch, the club's enthusiastic small committee has managed to develop The Beltane into a mini stadium despite only having a very modest budget. The ground is fully fenced off and offers a mixture of hard and grassed standing accommodation for c1,000 persons with Ladies and Gents toilets, Snack Bar, Hospitality Facility, a covered wheelchair viewing platform and a small covered enclosure for 50/60 persons. The Beltane was opened on 28 July 2012 with a match against a Motherwell F.C XI. For a number of years the record attendance was 300 set in a West of Scotland Cup tie against Ayrshire junior giants Auchinleck Talbot which was won 3–2 by the home team despite a three-division gap between the two clubs. However, this was surpassed by an attendance of c650 persons who attended a first leg semi-final of the Scottish Junior Cup on Saturday 14 April 2018.

In 2010, Wishaw Juniors secured a 10-year lease to use Beltane Park as the home ground. Since then, the once open-grassed area has been transformed into a football ground, with terracing along the east side of the ground, and fencing around the whole pitch. Also recently installed at the venue are toilets, a snack bar, a players lounge and dressing rooms, with each of them based in portacabins.

The ground had a capacity of around 500 spectators when officially opened on 28 July 2012, when Wishaw played the under-17's of the local senior side Motherwell.

Associated teams
The club had an under-19 side (now disbanded) and a women's team, which was originally formed in 1995 and has had its name changed several times. It was originally Wishaw Ladies then Lanarkshire Ladies and then Motherwell Ladies Football Club until it was changed to, Wishaw Juniors Ladies. The ladies team folded midway through 2011.

Honours 

 Scottish Consolation Cup
 1908–09

 Lanarkshire Cup
 1915–16, 1916–17

 Lanarkshire Express Cup
 1915–16

 Lancashire Consolation Cup
 1898–99

Near Misses
 Lanarkshire Junior Challenge Cup: 1890–91
 Lanarkshire Alliance League Runner-up: 1896–97

Wishaw Juniors 
 West of Scotland Cup: 1933–34
 West of Scotland Consolation Cup: 1931–32, 1936–37
 Lanarkshire League: 1925–26, 1934–35, 1937–38, 1940-41 1945–46
 Lanarkshire Junior Challenge Cup: 1925–26, 1933–34, 1937–38, 1941–42, 1965–66
 Lanarkshire Junior Consolation Cup 1919–20
 Lanarkshire Hozier Cup: 1919–20, 1920/21, 1936–37, 1946–47, 1950–51, 1960–61, 1962–63, 1966–67
 Lanarkshire Central Cup:1926–27, 1932–33, 1938–39, 1964–65
 Lanarkshire League Cup: 1925–26,1950–51, 1960–61 
 Lanarkshire Intermediate Cup: 1928-29
 St Michael's Cup: 1944–45
 Scottish Junior League Victory Cup: 1919–20

Near misses
 Scottish Junior Cup Semi-Finalists: 1934–35, 2017–18
 Scottish Intermediate Cup Finalists: 1928–29
 West of Scotland Cup Finalists: 1950–51
 East of Scotland Cup Finalists: 1942–43
 St Michael's Cup Finalists: 1941–42
 McIver Cup Finalists 1942-43
 Scottish Junior League Runner-up:1919–20
 Evening Citizen Cup Finalists: 1949–50
 Lanarkshire Junior Challenge Cup Finalists: 1920–21, 1934–35,1945–46
 Lanarkshire Junior League Runner-up: 1933–34, 1936–37, 1962–63
 Lanarkshire League Cup Finalists: 1926–27, 1937–38, 1938–39, 1954–55 
 Lanarkshire Central Cup Finalists: 1938–39, 1964–65
 Lanarkshire Consolation Cup Finalists: 1931–32
 Hozier Cup Finalists: 1921–22, 1932–33, 1933–34, 1935–36, 1945–46, 1955–56, 1961–62, 1964–65

Former players
Down the years approximately 150 Wishaw players have moved on to senior professional football clubs in Scotland, England and further afield. Several of these were involved in major trophy success as players, management and backroom staff. Two former players Bobby Moncur (Newcastle United captain) and Jimmy Gordon (as Part of Brian Clough's management team which won the European Cup twice With Nottingham Forest)  enjoyed successes in the major European football club competitions.
Others continued to play their football at Junior level and enjoyed success with Wishaw being capped also for the Scottish Junior FA International team.

1. FORMER PLAYERS AWARDED JUNIOR INTERNATIONAL CAPS
 1920 McNab – member of touring party which played 6 matches in Norway with 3 matches against Stavanger (in Stavanger) and 3 matches against Brann (in Bergen) – the first ever tour abroad by a Scottish 'representative' side at any level.
 1924 Mackay v Ireland
 1924 Kerr v England
 1926 Lynas v Ireland
 1926 Baillie v Wales
 1926 Lynas v Wales
 1937 Whiteford V England
 1938 Watt (capt) v Wales
 1939 Thomson v England
 1948 Hunter v Wales

2. FORMER PLAYERS AWARDED FULL SENIOR INTERNATIONAL CAPS
 Bobby Moncur (16)
 Alex Wilson (Arsenal) Also won FA Cup.
 John May (Rangers) (5)
 Bob Telfer (Australia) 
 Peter Buchanan(Chelsea) v Wales 1935

3. FORMER PLAYERS WITH OTHER INVOLVEMENT IN INTERNATIONAL FOOTBALL
 Peter Houston (Assistant Scotland Manager).
 Bob Telfer Player, Coach, Referee, Selector and Administrator of football in Australia – Member of Australian Football Hall Of Fame

4. FORMER PLAYERS WITH INVOLVEMENT IN EUROPEAN CLUB COMPETITIONS
 Bobby Moncur – Captain of Newcastle United 1969 Inter City Fairs Cup winning team. 
 Jimmy Gordon – Coach for Brian Clough's Nottingham Forest twice European Cup winning side. Assistant manager of Clough's Leeds United. Played for Newcastle and Middlesbrough. See book/film The Dammed United.
 Jackie Hutton – Manager of Cliftonville, took club into Cup Winners Cup against FC Nantes after winning Irish Cup in 1979.

5. PLAYERS WHO HAVE PLAYED AND/OR MANAGED IN SENIOR FOOTBALL 
 Peter Buchanan – Chelsea
 Jimmy Gordon – Newcastle, Middlesbrough
 Peter Houston – Falkirk, Dundee United
 Jackie Hutton – Cliftonville, Crusaders & Portadown. 
 George McGowan – Motherwell, Preston, Chester and Stockport County. Youth Coach at Wrexham 
 Matthew McVittie – Celtic
 Bobby Moncur – Newcastle, Sunderland, Carlisle. Managed Carlisle United, Heart of Midlothian, Plymouth Argyle, Hartlepool.
 Jimmy Moran – Leicester City, Norwich City, Northampton Town, Darlington and Workington
 John May – Rangers
 Jimmy Porter – Accrington Stanley, also was temporarily in charge of Manchester United.
 Clatworthy 'Charlie' Rennox – Manchester United, Clapton Orient, Grimsby Town.
 Alex Wilson – Arsenal (FA Cup winner)

6 PLAYERS TRANSFERRED / ETC to Senior Clubs before WWII INCOMPLETE LIST

Bill Michael	 	1898            Heart of Midlothian, Liverpool, Bristol City, Falkirk, Motherwell. One Scottish League Cap.
John May 	 	?1904	Rangers 178 appearance 18 goals 5 international appearances v Wales and Ireland 3 league appearances			
David Calderhead	 ? 
John Boylen	 	1921	        Lincoln City (Wigan, Grimsby)
William McFadyen       1921/22         Motherwell 1 International Cap 1 League Cap
George Harper          1921/22         Sunderland (Manchester City, Chrystal Palace Luton Town, Weymouth)
James W Porter	 	1921/22         Bury (Manchester City) (was City trainer in 1944, Managed Bury & Accrington Stanley). 
Thomas McKay           1924/25         St Mirren (Brighton)
James Yardley          1924/25         Clapton Orient (Luton, Charlton, Millwall, Third Lanark, Ayr United, Morton).
Alexander L McDougall  1925/26         Derby County (Wolverhampton Wanderers).
Craig Arnott           1926/27         Motherwell (Swansea).
Robert C Kerr          1927            Heart of Midlothian
Philip R Watson        1927/28         Hamilton Academicals (Barnsley, Blackpool, Queen of the South).
Robert Donnelly        1931/32         Partick Thistle (Manchester City, Morton). Won League Title With Manchester City. 
John Wood              1932/33         Clyde
Tommy Egan             1933            Hibernian
Robert Johnstone       1933/34         Partick Thistle (Motherwell, St Mirren, Albion Rovers).
Bob Telfer	 	? 
John McInally	 	1934
William Stoddart       1934            St Mirren 
William Black          1934            Hibernian (Watford, Dumfermline)
Peter Buchanan	 	1935 
James McCombe 	 	1934/35	        Heart of Midlothian (Clyde, Kings Park, Clapham Orient). 
James 'Jimmy'Gordon    1934/35         Newcastle United ( Middlesbrough) Trainer for Brian Clough (see separate entry).
William H Stoddart     1934/35         St Mirren
Peter S Buchanan       1935            Chelsea (Fulham) Scottish Cap v Ireland 1937
Thomas Brady           1935/36         Hibernian
Frank Farrell          1935/36         Hibernian (Clapham Orient)
George S Hull          1936            Sheffield United 
James M Lees           1937/38         Leith Athletic
James Watt             1937/38         Motherwell (Blackpool) Scottish Cap v Australia 1933
William Thornton       1937/38         Motherwell
John Divers            1938/39         Airdrieonians (Dundee United)
Alex Smith             1938/39         Motherwell (Clyde, East Fife)
Hugh O'Neil            1938/39         Celtic
William Hannah         1940/41         Partick Thistle (Albion Rovers)
George Henderson       1940/41         Dumbarton
DFG Hopkin             1940/41         Hamilton Academicals ( Previously with Wolverhampton Wanderers)
George Jeffrey         1940/41         Dumbarton (Aberdeen, Hamilton Academicals)
Andrew Jack 	 	?	        Tranmere
G Ross                 1940/41         Albion Rovers
James O'Neil            1940/41         Motherwell
Richard Hamilton        1941/42         Airdrionians
Richard Hamilton        1941/42         Morton
John Hunter             1941/42         Albion Rovers
Archibald Shaw          1941/42         Motherwell
Robert Torrance         1942            Dumbarton
John Craig              1942/43         Dumbarton (East Fife)
Charles Higgins         1942/43         Morton (Kilmarnock)
Reginald F Westbrook    1942/43         East Fife
Francis Walsh           1943/44         Ardeer Rec (Kilmarnock)
William Callan          1943/44         Kilmarnock
? Cunningham            1943/44         Falkirk
Robert Taggart          1944            Motherwell
John Collins            1944/45         Hibernian
David Mathie            1944/45         Motherwell
Alexander L Wemyss      1944/45
Samuel C Campbell       1945/46         Partick Thistle
Thomas McD McCabe       1945/46         Hibernian
James Henderson (1)     1945/46         Raith Rovers
James Henderson (2)     1945/46         Motherwell
Alexander Jardine       1945/46         Dundee United
James Kilgour           1945/46         Kilmarnock

7 PLAYERS TRANSFERRED ETC TO SENIOR CLUBS POST WWII INCOMPLETE LIST
Archie Shaw	 FB	1946–58		Motherwell 2 Scottish League Caps
Willie Thomson	 	1946–47		Falkirk
John McFarlane	 	1946–47		Hamilton Accies
Alec Jardine	 FB	1946–47		Dundee United, Millwall
Sammy Campbell	 W	1946–47		Partick Thistle
Willie McSeveney D	1946–48		Dunfermline then Motherwell (one of the Ancell Babes).
Jim Barclay	 W	1947–49		Airdrie
Phil Ward	 	1947		Hamilton
Dick Hamilton	 GK	1949–52		Motherwell
Guy Lennox	 CF	1951–53		Airdrie
Jimmy Greenock	 WH	1951–59		Queen of the South, Falcons New Jersey
Bob Park	 G	1951–52		Queen of the South, Hull City
John Murray	 	1951–52		Airdrie
Jack Henderson	 FB	1952–53		Clyde
Dave Shaw	 CF	1954–56		Airdrie
Harry Cross	 	1955–56		Hamilton Accies
Jimmy McManus	 	1955–57		Airdrie
James Moran	 IF	1956		Leicester City
Jim Ewart	 IR	1958	30 Aug	Airdrie
Tommy Milligan	 LH	1958	30 Aug	Airdrie
Johnny McCulloch OR	1958	11 Oct	Airdrie
Jim MacDonald	 IF	1958	11 Oct	Hibernian
John Markie	 CH	1959	2 July	Newcastle United
Eddie King	 IF	1960	27 Aug	Luton Town
Eddie King	 IL	1960	17 Sept	Hibernian
Robert Plenderlieth CH	1960	20 Oct	Hibernian
John McVittie	 W	1961–63		Celtic
Bobby Waugh	 OL	1961	25 Feb	East Fife then Boca Juniors, Argentina
John McCulloch	 CF	1961	28 Oct	Berwick Rangers
Eddie King	 IF	1961	4 Nov	Berwick Rangers
Bobby McSeveney	 FB	1961	16 Dec	Hull City
Bobby Moncur	 	1961	?	Newcastle United
John (Jackie) Hutton IF	1962	3 Mar	Hamilton Accies
George McGowan	OR	1962	11 Aug	Preston North End
George McGowan	OR	1962	18 Aug	Preston North End
John Carson	 	1962–63	?	Hamilton Accies
Willie Todd	OR	1963	1 June	Third Lanark
John Gilmour	IF	1964	29 Feb	Hamilton Accies
Peter Campbell	OL	1965		Stirling Albion
Enoch Gilchrist	IF	1967	19 Aug	Hamilton Accies
Bobby Fulton	LH	1970	12 Dec	Airdrionians
Jim McGuigan	CF	1971	27/11	Kilmarnock
Brian Lannon	M	!972-75		Ayr United
Joe Cairney	F	1975	13 Sep	Airdrie, Brisbane City and Brisbane Lions (favourite trick was the 'Cairney shuffle').
Douglas Watt	FB	1975	27 Dec	Airdrionians
Andy Docherty	FB	1976–79		Airdrie
Peter Houston	F	1977–78		Airdrie
Martin McBride	W	1985–90		Motherwell
Kevin McKeown	 	1985		Motherwell
Neil Candlish	F	1986–88		Motherwell
Mark Reilly	M	1989–90		Motherwell
Chris Newall	D	2003		Arbroath
Alan Creer	GK	2005		Albion Rovers
Daniel Kindlan F       2018            Queens Park
Dean Kindlan   M       2018            Queens Park
Paul McGeough  M       2018            Albion Rovers

8 BITS AND PIECES
 1932/33 Wishaw v Royal Albert Scottish Junior Cup – 1-1, 1-1, 2-0 (Protest) 1-1, Wishaw 1- Royal Albert 0 
 1935/36 On Sat 2 April 1935 Wishaw lose 2–1 to Tranent in Round 7 of the Scottish Junior Cup in front of 16,513 at Tynecastle (Heart of Midlothian FC) ending a 33-game unbeaten run.
In the previous round it took four games to separate Wishaw and Shotts United with a total of 26,500 watching the matches the last being hosted at Fir Park (Motherwell FC).
 In 1935 Wishaw also played host to Edinburgh senior clubs Heart of Midlothian and Hibernian in testimonial matches for players Jimmy Sommerville and Archie Bryce respectively.
 1979/80 Wishaw v Musselburgh Scottish Junior Cup - 0-0, 0-0, 3-3, 1-1, Musselburgh 0 Wishaw 2
 Local lad Jimmy Delaney played one trial for Wishaw before signing for Celtic and later moving to Manchester United.

9. In Progress

 Pat Holton
 Jim McCafferty
 Tally Sneddon

References

Further reading
 Scottish Football Association – Registered Players Database
 Wishaw Press Newspaper
 Hamilton Advertiser Newspaper
 Motherwell Times Newspaper
 Sunday Post Newspaper
 100 Years of Junior Football – McGlone
 West of Scotland Juniors – John Aitken
 East of Scotland Juniors – Graham McGinty
 Scottish Football Historical Archive – Website
 Scottish Non-League Review – Stewart Davidson

External links

Facebook
Twitter
 Daily Record
Ground information at Wishaw Juniors F.C.

Wishaw
Football clubs in Scotland
1885 establishments in Scotland
Scottish Junior Football Association clubs
Football in North Lanarkshire
Association football clubs established in 1885
West of Scotland Football League teams